The British H-class submarines were Holland 602 type submarines used by the Royal Navy. The submarines constructed for the British Royal Navy between 1915 and 1919 were designed and built in response to German boats which mined British waters and sank coastal shipping with ease owing to their small size. The H class was created to perform similar operations in German waters, and to attack German submarines operating in British waters.

Despite their cramped size and lack of a deck gun on some submarines, the class was popular amongst submariners, and saw action all around the British Isles, some being transferred as far as the Adriatic.

Post-war, many were retained in the Royal Navy for training purposes, while four more were lost in accidents during the 1920s. At the outbreak of the Second World War, the class was obsolete, but retained in training and coastal warfare roles to help the Royal Navy cope with heavy losses to the submarine fleet during the early stages of the war. Two were sunk in this role by German countermeasures. The Canada-built boats were equipped with Fessenden transducers, which were missing from the US-built boats.

Boats

Group 1
Group 1 was built in Canada at the Canadian Vickers Yards in Montreal before being transported across the Atlantic and deployed from Britain as British shipyards were too busy to construct submarines at this time.
  – Launched May 1915
  – Launched June 1915
  – Launched June 1915. Mined and sunk July 1916
  – Launched June 1915
  – Launched June 1915. Rammed and sunk March 1918
  – Launched June 1915. Interned and purchased by the Dutch January 1916
  – Launched June 1915
  – Launched June 1915
  – Launched June 1915
  – Launched June 1915. Disappeared 1918

Group 2
The second group was constructed simultaneously with the first group, but at Fore River Yard at Quincy, Massachusetts in the then-neutral United States. When the US government discovered the construction, they impounded all the completed units, only releasing them following their own declaration of war two years later. To escape this difficulty, the British government gave six units to the Chilean Navy as partial payment for the appropriation of six Chilean ships for British service in 1914.
  – Launched 1915. 
  – Launched 1915.
  – Launched 1918, transferred to Chile
  – Launched 1919, transferred to Canada
  – Launched 1918, transferred to Canada
  – Launched 1918, transferred to Chile
  – Launched 1918, transferred to Chile
  – Launched 1918, transferred to Chile
  – Launched 1918, transferred to Chile
  – Launched 1918, transferred to Chile

Group 3
Group 3 was the largest group, and was constructed in 1917–1919 in Britain, shipyard space having been granted to the project and more boats needed following the seizure of those building in the United States. They were built by Vickers, Cammell Laird, Armstrong Whitworth and William Beardmore at several locations, and most of the boats enjoyed long careers in the Royal Navy.
  – Launched 1918
  – Launched 1918
  – Launched 1918
  – Launched 1918
  – Launched 1918
  – Launched 1918
  – Launched 1918
  – Launched 1918. Sank in dockyard accident 1926
  – Launched 1918
  – Launched 1919. Mined and sunk 1941
  – Launched 1919
  – Launched 1919
  – Launched 1919
Numbers H35-H40 were ordered from Cammell Laird but cancelled in 1919
  – Launched 1918. Wrecked in collision 1920
  – Launched 1919. Wrecked in collision 1922
  – Launched 1919
  – Launched 1920
Numbers H45 and H46 cancelled.
  – Launched 1919. Wrecked in collision 1929
  – Launched 1919
  – Launched 1919. Sunk by German surface units 1940
  – Launched 1920
  – Launched 1919
  – Launched 1919
H53 and H54 cancelled.

See also
 List of submarines of the Second World War
 List of submarine classes of the Royal Navy

Notes

Bibliography

External links

The Canadian built British H boats
U-boat.net information page on surviving World War Two boats

H
 
 
Submarines of the Royal Canadian Navy